Body double may refer to:

 Body double, a person who substitutes in a scene for another actor such that the person's face is not shown
 Body Double, a 1984 American erotic thriller film co-written and directed by Brian De Palma and starring Craig Wasson, Gregg Henry, Melanie Griffith, and Deborah Shelton
 Body double, a 2004 novel written by Tess Gerritsen, the fourth book of the Maura Isles/Jane Rizzoli series